Xádo is a multinational company with headquarters in Germany, the Netherlands, and Ukraine, that manufactures revitalizants, lubricants, oils, greases, aftermarket oil additives, fuel additives, and firearms.

History 
The company was founded in 1991 in Kharkiv, Ukraine. The name Xádo was shortened from the Ukrainian words Kharkovskiy Dom (Kharkov House). In 1998, the directors of the company patented the development of a revitalizant product, a metal treatment which has the ability to repair, restore and protect the mechanism against wear. The first consumer-packaged product was introduced in December 1999. In 2004 in the Netherlands, together with European manufacturer of oils Eurol, Xádo established Xádo Lube B.V., specializing in manufacturing oil with atomic revitalizant XADO Atomic Oil. In addition to the Netherlands, Xádo has headquarters in Germany; Xádo products are produced under Xádo Germany and Xádo Lube B.V. Netherlands licenses. Xádo repairing products possess TÜV performance confirmation certificate, ISO 17025, American Petroleum Institute (API) approvals.

Activity 
The company manufactures over 1,000 products, primarily for car maintenance, which can be purchased in more than 100 countries all over the world (as of March 2011).
The best-known Xádo products include revitalizants, atomic oils, and VeryLube car care products. The specialists assess Xádo as the major player in the Ukrainian market of imported and domestic antifriction materials as well, actively occupying almost all major regions of the post-Soviet countries. The company's share of the market is 24%, whereas in the segment of nanoceramics it is up to 90%.

Sports 
 Xádo owns a motorsports team XADO Motorsport, the champion of Ukrainian Rally and Circular Racing Cups.
 Xádo is a sponsor of Pro100!XADO, the first Ukrainian gamer team to win the International computer games tournament.
 In September 2011 Xádo started to cooperate with one of the most titled football clubs of Ukraine, “Shakhtar”.

References

External links
 XADO information website
 XADO Online store

Ukrainian brands
Oil additives
Firearm manufacturers of Ukraine
1991 establishments in Ukraine
Companies based in Kharkiv